María Dolores "Mary" Tarrero-Serrano de Prio (5 October 1924 – 24 September 2010) was the First Lady of Cuba from 1948 to 1952.  She was the second wife of Cuban President, Carlos Prio, who was overthrown by Fulgencio Batista in the 1952 Cuban coup d'état.

Birth and early life
Terrero was born on the sugarcane mill "Pina" in eastern Camaguey.  Her father, Gerardo Terrero, was the mill's accountant and her mother was Elvira Serrano. She and an older sister, Ana, studied stenography.

Marriage and life as First Lady
While working in the Cuban Senate, she met her husband, who was a senator. They married on June 14, 1945 and they had two daughters, María Antonieta and María Elena. At the age of 24, she became the First Lady of Cuba.  Their youngest daughter was born in the Presidential Palace.  While she was the First Lady, Osvaldo Farrés, the composer of the song Quizas, Quizas, Quizas (Perhaps, Perhaps, Perhaps), composed the song Sensacion inspired by her.

Exile and death

She and her family went into their first exile in 1952. In 1956, after Batista granted an "amnesty", they returned for a short time until they were forced into exile again at gunpoint.  After Batista was overthrown by the Cuban Revolution (which Prio supported financially). they returned to Cuba in January 1959. They went into their final exile in December 1959, when they realized that Fidel Castro's government had become a communist government. Her husband, the last constitutionally elected president of Cuba, committed suicide in 1977 and she died in 2010 of pneumonia. She and her husband, Carlos, are buried at Caballero Rivero Woodlawn North Park Cemetery and Mausoleum in Miami, Florida.

References
 The Miami Herald; Maria Dolores 'Mary' Terrero Prio, 'Beautiful' First Lady of Cuba; 24 September 2010 Page 5B.

1924 births
2010 deaths
First ladies of Cuba
Opposition to Fidel Castro
Cuban exiles
Cuban emigrants to the United States
20th-century Cuban women
Deaths from pneumonia in Florida
People from Camagüey Province